The Second Western Army was created during 1810 as part of the reform of the Imperial Russian Army as a whole and was intended to defend the central western region of the Russian border with Poland (Duchy of Warsaw) to the Austrian border during the expected French invasion of Russia.

Commander-in-Chief General of the Infantry Prince P.I. Bagration

Chief of Staff - Major General Graf E.F. de Saint-Priest

General- quartermaster - Major General M.S. Vistitskiy 2nd

Duty General - Fligel-Adjutant Colonel S.N. Marin

Chief of Artillery - Major General Baron K.F. Levenshtern

Chief of Engineers - Major General E.Kh. Ferster
 7th Infantry Corps - Lieutenant General N.N. Raevskiy
 8th Infantry Corps - Lieutenant General M.M. Borozdin
 4th Cavalry Corps - Major General Graf K.K. Sivers

The total strength of the army was 46 infantry battalions, 52 cavalry squadrons, 9 cossack regiments, and 180 cannon. The Second Western Army had approximately 45,000−49,423 men, and during the time of June-July, 1812, according to generals Barclay de Tolly, Bagration and Tormasov, was positioned along a 50-mile long front near the areas of Wolkovysk and Belostock.

See also
First Western Army

References

Armies of the Russian Empire
Military units and formations established in 1810